The Aircraft Technologies Atlantis is an American aerobatic homebuilt aircraft, built by Aircraft Technologies of Lilburn, Georgia.  The aircraft is supplied as a kit or in the form of plans for amateur construction.

Design and development
The Atlantis is a two-seat side-by side low wing aircraft with conventional landing gear. The fuselage is constructed of welded steel tubing. Fuel tanks are located in the wings, with a central header tank. The aircraft uses two control sticks for each pilot and a pull-up flap handle between the seats. The seats recline to a 35 degree angle.

Operational history
In November 2014 three examples were registered in the United States with the Federal Aviation Administration.

Specifications (Atlantis)

See also

References

External links

Atlantis
Homebuilt aircraft
Aerobatic aircraft